The Poe Elementary School bombing was a school bombing that occurred at Poe Elementary School in Boulevard Oaks, Houston, Texas, United States on September 15, 1959. Six people, including the perpetrator and his own son, were killed.

Paul Orgeron and Dusty Paul
Paul Harold Orgeron, age 49, a tile-setter and ex-convict, had recently moved from Altus, Oklahoma to southern Houston, Texas with his seven-year-old son, Dusty Paul. According to Orgeron's ex-wife, Hazel, they divorced twice due to spousal abuse. Orgeron briefly rented at a nearby boarding house using the pseudonym Bob Silver. The landlord later said the father and son were quiet and had not caused any trouble.

Orgeron attempted to enroll his son in second grade at Edgar Allan Poe Elementary School but was denied since he lacked birth and health certificates for his son. He left the school office claiming he would return the next day with the documents.

The bombing
Minutes after leaving the school office, around 10:00 am, Orgeron and his son approached a teacher, Patricia Johnston, on the school playground, who had been gathering her second graders for their return to the classroom. Orgeron, carrying a brown suitcase, gave her two pieces of paper to read. She was unable to understand them since the notes were illegible. Orgeron muttered about "having power in a suitcase," the will of God and having to "get to the children".

Orgeron asked that the children gather around him, and as he waved the suitcase around, Johnston became alarmed upon seeing a doorbell button on the bottom of the suitcase and instructed the students to return to the building. She also instructed two students to fetch the school principal, R. E. Doty, and the school custodian, James Montgomery, the only adult male in the school.

When the Principal and the Custodian arrived, Orgeron ignored Doty's instructions to leave the school grounds. Then Orgeron detonated the suitcase which contained perhaps six sticks of dynamite. The blast was so massive that witnesses thought they were under a Soviet Nuclear attack.

The explosion claimed six lives, including both Orgeron and his son; two students; custodian Montgomery and a teacher, Jennie Kolter. Of the eighteen injured, principal Doty suffered a broken leg, and two children each lost a leg.

William Kolter, the son of Jennie Kolter, was chief resident at Hermann Hospital; he pronounced Jennie Kolter dead.
There are plaques in the school to this affect.
Credit must be given to Mr. Montgomery, the custodian, who walked over to the bomber and talked to him, allowing more teachers and children to get away. He died saving "his kids."

Fatalities
 Paul Harold Orgeron, 49 (the bomber)
 Dusty Paul Orgeron, 7
 Jennie Katharine Kolter, 54
 James Arlie Montgomery, 56
 William S. Hawes Jr., 7
 John Cecil Fitch Jr., 8

The Texas National Guard was called out to protect other elementary schools in the blast's aftermath because the authorities were not certain whether the bomber had been killed in the blast.

Police response
Police responded to find a  hole in the asphalt "black top" play area. Victims' mangled bodies were burnt; some, including Doty, had their clothes ripped from them by the blast. One girl was blown over 100 feet away.

Police thought the bomber might have escaped and have other bombs, so the school was evacuated. After completing a bomb search, a roll-call by teachers showed that all students were present, except for those dead or injured.

Very little of Orgeron was found. Only small body parts were recovered from the surrounding bushes, buildings and homes. Orgeron's left hand was found in a hedge indicating he had died in the blast. It was used to identify him through fingerprints which were on file from prior convictions.

His nearby station wagon contained explosives and an August 25 receipt for detonators and 150 sticks of dynamite from Grants, New Mexico, where Orgeron had been between leaving Altus and arriving in Houston.

His prior convictions on safe-cracking perhaps explain his knowledge of dynamite.

Contents of notes
Police managed to decipher Orgeron's notes:

First note
Please do not get excite over this order I’m giving you. In this suitcase you see in my hand is fill to the top with high explosive. I mean high high. Please believe me when I say I have 2 more (illegible) that are set to go off at two times. I do not believe I can kill and not kill what is around me, an I mean my son will go. Do as I say an no one will get hurt. Please. —P. H. Orgeron

Second note
Do not get the Police department yet, I’ll tell you when.

Please do not get excite over this order I’m giving you. In this suitcase you see in my hand it fill to the top with high explosive. Please do not make me push this button that all I have to do. And also have two 2 more cases (illegible) high explosive that are set to go off at a certain time at three different places so it will more harm to kill me, so do as I say and no one will get hurt. An I would like to talk about god while waiting for my wife.

Although previously not a religious man, Orgeron said he had recently "found God", according to family members who had attended Dusty's 7th birthday party at Dusty's grandmother's house just the Saturday before.

Aftermath
Unlike school attacks in the early 21st century, there was no constant national and international media coverage of the Poe attack. No memorial was constructed at Poe Elementary. The school was open the next day with approximately half of the students attending with increases each day even though cleanup and repairs were underway. There were no grief councilors. HISD named two new elementary schools after victims of the attack: Kolter Elementary School in Meyerland and Montgomery Elementary School in Southwest Houston.

References

External links

 
 
 Major Houston Fires - School Explosion 1959 has a fire-fighter's point of view.
 Violence In Our Schools - Poe Elementary School, Houston, Texas lists the dead and injured victims' names and ages.(Archive)
 "TEXAS: That Man Has Dynamite" (Archive) TIME. Monday September 28, 1959 - names Orgeron's 16-year-old stepdaughter, Betty Jean, as Dusty's mother.
 
  - Houston Chronicle article on the Poe bombing
 A book review of Ed Gooding: Soldier, Texas Ranger that includes excerpts related to the Poe bombing

1959 in Texas
1959 disasters in the United States
1959 murders in the United States
Crimes in Houston
Explosions in 1959
Filicides in Texas
History of Houston
Mass murder in 1959
Mass murder in Texas
Murder–suicides in Texas
September 1959 events in the United States
School bombings in the United States
School massacres in the United States
Suicide bombings in the United States